Der Graf von Cagliostro is a 1920 silent film directed and co-written by Reinhold Schünzel and starring Schünzel, Anita Berber and Conrad Veidt. It depicts the life of the eighteenth century Italian mesmerist and occultist Alessandro Cagliostro, who called himself Cagliostro. The film is considered a lost film.

Cast

Release and reception
Der Graf von Cagliostro has its world premiere on December 21, 1920, at Busch-Kino, Vienna. It was later shown in Germany on Februaryt 17, 192 at the Marmorhaus in Berlin.

Der Kinematograph declared the film as "marvelously effective cinema" while the script is "the weakest element in the entire production." The review also praised Carl Goetz who "gives the best performance of all" and Conrad Veidt as "very effective in his opulent costumes".
A review in Film-Kurier stated that the film "could have been a masterpiece", blaming Robert Liebmann's script which "didn't expend any extra energy and what he did manage doesn't come close to the demands of this subject." The review echoed Der Kinematographs review stating "Carl Goetz and Conrad Veidt are the only actors whose every gesture is perfect."

References

Sources

External links

1920 films
1920s historical films
1920 lost films
Austrian historical films
Austrian silent feature films
Films directed by Reinhold Schünzel
Films set in the 18th century
Films about Alessandro Cagliostro
Austrian black-and-white films